The Hungarian Cup is the Hungarian cup competition for water polo. It has been incepted by the Hungarian Water Polo Federation, the Magyar Vízilabda Szövetség in 1999.

Most successful participant in the Magya Kupa has been the Dunaújváros with 19 wins. The current holders are UVSE.

Winners
Previous cup winners are: 

 1999/00: Szentes
 2000/01: Dunaújváros
 2001/02: Dunaújváros
 2002/03: Dunaújváros
 2003/04: Dunaújváros
 2004/05: Bp. Honvéd
 2006: Bp. Honvéd
 2007: OSC
 2008: Bp. Honvéd
 2009: Dunaújváros
 2010: Szentes
 2011: BVSC
 2012: Eger
 2013: Dunaújváros
 2014: UVSE
 2015: UVSE
 2016: UVSE
 2017: UVSE
 2018: UVSE
 2019:
 2020:
 2021:

Finals
The following table contains all the finals from the sixty years long history of the Magyar Kupa. In some occasions, there was not held a final match but a final tournament. In these cases, the team with the most total points have been crowned as cup winners.

Performances

By club
The performance of various clubs is shown in the following table:

Notes

By county

 The bolded teams are currently playing in the 2018-19 season of the Hungarian League.

See also
 Országos Bajnokság I (National Championship of Hungary)

References

External links
 Hungarian Water Polo Federaration 
 Magyar Kupa winners